Thiallela ligeralis is a species of moth of the family Pyralidae. It is found in  Sri Lanka, Pakistan, India and other oriental regions.

Larval food plants include Manilkara zapota and Pyrus communis.

References

External links
THE GENUS THIALLELA WALKER, 1863 IN CHINA (LEPIDOPTERA: PYRALIDAE: PHYCITINAE)

Moths described in 1863
Phycitinae